Elliott Jones (January 24, 1908 – February 15, 1994) was an American sports shooter. He competed in the 50 m pistol event at the 1936 Summer Olympics.

References

1908 births
1994 deaths
American male sport shooters
Olympic shooters of the United States
Shooters at the 1936 Summer Olympics
Sportspeople from Syracuse, New York
20th-century American people